The City is the third album by Canadian indie rock group FemBots, released in 2005 on Paper Bag Records.

Guest musicians on the album include Jason Tait, Greg Smith, Julie Penner, Nathan Lawr, Lawrence Nichols and Krista Muir.

Track listing

 "So Long"
 "Count Down Our Days"
 "Up from the Ditches"
 "Demolition Waltz"
 "Demolition Waltz, Part II"
 "My Life in the Funeral Service"
 "The City"
 "Gilded Age"
 "Hell"
 "History Remade"

2005 albums
Fembots (band) albums
Paper Bag Records albums